Jagielnica  is a village in the administrative district of Gmina Przeworno, Poland. It is located within Strzelin County, Lower Silesian Voivodeship, in the south-west of the country. The village has a population of 110.

History 
The village was founded by residents of another Jagielnica, now in western Ukraine, fleeing the onset of World War II. 
The territory belonged to Poland prior to 1939, and prior to 1945 it was in Germany.

Geography 

References

Jagielnica